The Harbin International Ice and Snow festival is an annual winter festival that takes place with a theme in Harbin, Heilongjiang, China, and now is the largest ice and snow festival in the world. At first participants in the festival were mainly Chinese, however it has since become an international festival and competition, with the  festival attracting 18 million visitors and generating 28.7 billion yuan ($4.4 billion) of revenue. The festival includes the world's biggest ice sculptures.

The festival exhibits open from late December to late February. While ice sculptures are erected throughout the city, there are two main exhibition areas:  
 Sun Island is a recreational area on the opposite side of the Songhua River from the city, which features an expo of enormous snow sculptures.  
 Ice and Snow World is an area open in the afternoon and at night which features illuminated full size buildings made from blocks of 2–3' thick ice taken directly from the Songhua River. The park usually opens from late December to late February. In 1999, the first Ice and Snow World opened to public to celebrate the millennium. Each year the park has to be rebuilt with newly designed ice buildings and snow and ice sculptures. In recent years, the park has been as large as 800 meters (80 hectares).
During the festival, there are ice lantern park touring activities held in many parks in the city. Winter activities during the festival include Yabuli alpine skiing, winter-swimming in the Songhua River, and the ice-lantern exhibition in Zhaolin Garden.

Harbin is located in Northeast China and receives cold winter wind from Siberia. The average temperature in summer is 21.2 °C (70.2 °F), and –16.8 °C (1.8 °F) in winter. Annual lows of -25 °C (–13 °F) are not uncommon.

History 

The festival originated in Harbin's traditional ice lantern show and garden party that takes place in winter, which began in 1963. It was interrupted for a number of years during the Cultural Revolution, but has since been resumed when an annual event at Zhaolin Park was announced on January 5, 1985.

In 2001 the Harbin Ice Festival was merged with Heilongjiang's International Ski Festival and got its new formal name, the Harbin International Ice and Snow Sculpture Festival.

In 2007, the festival featured a Canadian themed sculpture, in memory of Canadian doctor Norman Bethune. The composition consisted of two parts: the "Niagara Falls" and the "crossing the Bering Strait" (the latter depicting the migration of the First Nations).

In 2014, the festival celebrated its 30th anniversary with the theme "50-Year Ice Snow, Charming Harbin". Various fairs, competitions and expos were held from December 20, 2013 to February 28, 2014.

In 2015, the 31st Harbin Ice Snow Festival opened on January 5 and was themed "Ice Snow Harbin, Charming China Dreams around the world" with opening ceremony, firework show, ice lanterns , birthday parties, snow sculpture competitions and expos, as well as winter swimming, winter fishing, group wedding ceremony, fashion shows, concerts, ice sport games lasting from December 22, 2014 to early March 2015.

At the 35th annual festival held in 2019, the festival's most popular attraction, the Harbin Ice and Snow World, took up over 600,000 square meters and included more than 100 landmarks. It was made from 110,000 cubic meters of ice and 120,000 cubic meters of snow. The festival also included ice sculptures by artists from 12 different countries competing in the annual competition.

Celebrating its 36th year in 2020, this festival is presently viewed as one of the world's top winter celebrations, joining the ranks of the Sapporo Snow Festival in Japan, Canada's Quebec Winter Carnival and Norway's Holmenkollen Ski Festival. In 2020, the sculptures were produced using roughly 220,000 cubic meters of ice blocks, all pulled from the nearby Songhua River.

Construction
 
Swing saws are used to carve ice into blocks, taken from the frozen surface of the Songhua River. Chisels, ice picks and various types of saws are then used by ice sculptors to carve out large scaled ice sculptures, many of them intricately designed and worked on all day and night prior to the commencement of the festival. Deionised water can also be used, producing ice blocks as transparent as glass to make clear sculptures rather than translucent ones. Multicoloured lights are also used to give colour to ice, creating variations on sculptured spectacles when lit up especially at night. Some ice sculptures made in previous years include: buildings and monuments of different architectural types and styles, figures including animals people and mythical creatures, slippery dips or ice slides and lanterns. Apart from winter recreational activities available in Harbin, these exquisitely detailed, mass-produced ice sculptures are the main draw card in attracting tourists around the world to the festival.

Gallery

See also
Other large ice and snow festivals include Japan's Sapporo Snow Festival, Canada's Quebec City Winter Carnival, and Norway's Holmenkollen Ski Festival.
Ice palace
Snow sculpture
Sand sculpture
Winter carnival

References

External links
 Feature on the Boston Globe Big Picture

Festivals in China
Winter festivals
Tourist attractions in Harbin
Outdoor sculptures in China
Water ice
1963 establishments in China
Winter events in China
Snow sculpture
Culture in Harbin